Reyhan-e Sofla (also Romanized as Reyḩan-e Soflá and Reyhan Sofla; also known as Reyḩān-e Pā’īn) is a village in Rostaq Rural District, in the Central District of Khomeyn County, Markazi Province, Iran. At the 2006 census, its population was 802, in 226 families.

References 

Populated places in Khomeyn County